Dallas James Drake (born February 4, 1969) is a Canadian former professional ice hockey winger in the National Hockey League who last played for the Detroit Red Wings. Having played the beginning and end of his NHL career with Detroit, he won his first and only Stanley Cup championship in his final NHL season in 2008.

Previously, Drake played for the Winnipeg Jets/Phoenix Coyotes, and St. Louis Blues. Drake played his college hockey at Northern Michigan University.

Playing career
Dallas Drake was drafted by the Detroit Red Wings in the 1989 NHL Entry Draft in the 6th round, 116th overall. During his junior year at Northern Michigan, he was a key factor in the team winning the 1991 NCAA Men's Ice Hockey Championship. In the final game, NMU captain Darryl Plandowski scored the winning goal as the Wildcats defeated Boston University 8–7 in triple overtime.

Following a stellar four-year college career, Drake made the Red Wings roster out of training camp without playing in the minor leagues. He enjoyed a fine rookie season in 1992–93, posting 44 points on 18 goals and 26 assists. The following season he was part of a trade that saw him shipped to the Winnipeg Jets along with goaltender Tim Cheveldae. The Red Wings received goaltender Bob Essensa and defenceman Sergei Bautin in return. The trade was generally a wash for the Wings, as Essensa appeared in only 13 games and was not a factor in the playoffs. Drake went on to have a successful role on the checking lines and penalty kill units of the Winnipeg/Phoenix Coyotes organization.

During Drake's time with the Coyotes, Phoenix-area band, Stone Bogart, wrote and recorded the song "Dallas Drake," depicting many great moments by the player and clipping various radio broadcasts. The song was used on ESPN and ABC broadcasts of NHL games for the few years following the song's release.

Drake was known as a tenacious skater and a tough customer in the corners throughout his 16-year career. Although he wasn't a prolific goal scorer as a pro like he was in college, his knowledge of the game, leadership and fierce competitiveness allowed him to skate in 1009 NHL games. Since 1992, he was sent to the minor leagues only once. In the 1993–1994 season, Drake skated one game in Adirondack on a rehab assignment, scoring two goals before returning to Detroit the following day and finishing with 10 goals and 22 assists.

Drake signed with the St. Louis Blues for the 2000–01 season, and remained with the organization for six seasons. He achieved his career high in goals with 20 during the 2002–03 season, and was named captain for the 2005–06 and 2006–07 seasons.

Drake was placed on waivers by the Blues on June 26, 2007 with the purpose of buying out his contract.

On July 9, 2007, he was signed as an unrestricted free agent by the Red Wings to a one-year, $550,000 contract. He had considered ending his professional career with other NHL teams, but chose to return to Detroit in hopes of winning the Stanley Cup with the club that had drafted him over 16 years prior.  On June 4, 2008 those dreams were realized when Detroit defeated the Pittsburgh Penguins to win their 11th franchise Stanley Cup championship. During the on ice post-game celebrations Detroit captain Nicklas Lidström passed the Stanley Cup to Drake first.

On July 15, 2008, Drake announced his retirement from the NHL.

Personal
Dallas Drake grew up in Rossland, British Columbia, he lives with his family in Traverse City, Michigan and still spends time in Marquette, Michigan. He has four children, Jakson, Delaney, Darby, and Dysen. Both Jakson and Delaney play youth hockey in Traverse City. Dallas Drake coaches Dysen's hockey team. His daughter Delaney Drake plays for the Wisconsin Badgers women's ice hockey team. She was a member of the US squad that captured the gold medal at the 2017 IIHF World Women's U18 Championship. In addition, she scored a goal for the US in the gold medal game. Drake's daughter Darby is on the University of Nebraska Omaha swimming & diving team.

Drake was inducted into the Northern Michigan University Hall of Fame in 2002.

Career statistics

Awards and honors
 Stanley Cup champion 2008
 World's fastest skater (1991)
 Ryan Raasch Coach’s Pet of the Year Award (1999)

See also
Captain (ice hockey)
List of NHL players with 1000 games played

References

External links

1969 births
Living people
Canadian ice hockey right wingers
Detroit Red Wings draft picks
Detroit Red Wings players
Northern Michigan University alumni
Northern Michigan Wildcats men's ice hockey players
People from Trail, British Columbia
People from Traverse City, Michigan
Phoenix Coyotes players
St. Louis Blues players
Stanley Cup champions
Vernon Lakers players
Winnipeg Jets (1979–1996) players
Ice hockey people from British Columbia
NCAA men's ice hockey national champions
AHCA Division I men's ice hockey All-Americans
Sportspeople from Trail, British Columbia
Sportspeople from Traverse City, Michigan